Khatthalee Pinsuwan (born October 30, 1994) is a Thai indoor volleyball player of Idea Khonkaen. She is a member of the Thailand women's national volleyball team.

Awards

Clubs
 2012–13 Thailand League -  Champion, with Idea Khonkaen
 2013 Thai–Denmark Super League -  Champion, with Idea Khonkaen
 2015 Thai–Denmark Super League -  Third, with Idea Khonkaen
 2016 Thai–Denmark Super League -  Third, with Idea Khonkaen
 2019 Thai–Denmark Super League -  Third, with Khonkaen Star
 2020 Thailand League –  Runner-up, with Khonkaen Star

References

External links
 FIVB Biography

1994 births
Living people
Khatthalee Pinsuwan
Khatthalee Pinsuwan
Asian Games medalists in volleyball
Volleyball players at the 2014 Asian Games
Khatthalee Pinsuwan
Medalists at the 2014 Asian Games
Khatthalee Pinsuwan
Khatthalee Pinsuwan